The Tobacco Advertising and Promotion Act 2002 (c.36) is an Act of the Parliament of the United Kingdom.  Under this Act, the advertising of tobacco products to the public is banned in the United Kingdom, except on the premises of specialist tobacconists.

See also 
 Smoking in the United Kingdom

References

External links
The Tobacco Advertising and Promotion Act 2002, as originally enacted, from the Office of Public Sector Information.

United Kingdom Acts of Parliament 2002
Advertising in the United Kingdom
Advertising regulation
Smoking in the United Kingdom
Tobacco advertising
Regulation in the United Kingdom